This is a list of ice hockey teams in Norway, sorted for the 2015–16 season.

Men

GET-ligaen 

Source: pointstreak.com

First Division 
Bergen, Bergen
Comet Halden, Halden
Furuset, Oslo
Grüner, Oslo
Hasle/Løren, Oslo
Moss, Moss
Narvik, Narvik
Nes, Nes
Ringerike Panthers, Hønefoss
Tønsberg Vikings, Tønsberg
Source: hockey.no

Second Division 
Gjøvik, Gjøvik
Grüner 2, Oslo
Haugesund Seagulls, Haugesund
Jutul, Bærum
Nidaros, Trondheim
Prinsdalen Wheels, Oslo
Ski Icehawks, Ski
Source: hockey.no

Third Division

West 
Forus/Sandnes, Sandnes
Hafrsfjord Kings, Stavanger
Kristiansand, Kristiansand
Lyderhorn Gladiators, Bergen
Source: hockey.no

East, Group A
Comet Halden 2, Halden
Eiksmarka, Bærum
Hasle/Løren 2, Oslo
Holmen, Asker
Nesøya, Asker
Oppsal, Oslo
Rasta, Lørenskog
Tromsø, Tromsø
Source: hockey.no

East, Group B
Gjøvik 2, Gjøvik
Jar, Bærum
Kongsberg, Kongsberg
Kongsvinger Knights 2, Kongsvinger
Ringerike Panthers 2, Hønefoss
Skedsmo, Skedsmo
Skien, Skien
Ullensaker, Jessheim
Source: hockey.no

Fourth Division

Group A 
Aker Bulldogs, Oslo
Bøler, Oslo
Forward Flyers, Oslo
Grüner 3, Oslo
Nes 2, Nes
Nordstrand, Oslo
Ski Icehawks 2, Ski
Source: hockey.no

Group B 
Eiksmarka 2, Bærum
Gamle Oslo, Oslo
Hasle/Løren 3, Oslo
Jar 2, Bærum
Jordal, Oslo
Rosenhoff, Oslo
Skedsmo 2, Skedsmo
Ullensaker 2, Jessheim
Source: hockey.no

Women

Elite 
Jordal, Oslo
Sparta, Sarpsborg
Stavanger, Stavanger
Vålerenga, Oslo
Source: hockey.no

First Division 
Bergen, Bergen
Grüner, Oslo
Jordal 2, Oslo
Kongsberg/Ringerike, Kongsberg/Hønefoss
Nes, Nes
Skedsmo, Skedsmo
Stavanger 2, Stavanger
Tromsø, Tromsø
Wing, Trondheim
Source: hockey.no

External links
 of the Norwegian Ice Hockey Federation

 
Norway teams
ice hockey